The 2001 Florida Citrus Bowl was a college football bowl game held on January 1, 2001 at the Florida Citrus Bowl in Orlando, Florida.  The Michigan Wolverines, co-champions of the Big Ten Conference, defeated the Auburn Tigers, champions of the Southeastern Conference's Western Division, 31-28.  Michigan running back Anthony Thomas was named the game's MVP.

References

External links
 Summary at Bentley Historical Library, University of Michigan Athletics History

Florida Citrus Bowl
Citrus Bowl (game)
Auburn Tigers football bowl games
Michigan Wolverines football bowl games
Tangerine Bowl|Florida Citrus Bowl
Florida Citrus Bowl